A sneckdown (or snowy neckdown) is a temporary curb extension caused by snowfall, where snow has built up in the road but not been flattened by traffic, effectively reshaping the curb. Sneckdowns show how the space is being used by vehicle and foot traffic, and may reveal points where a street could be usefully narrowed with neckdowns to slow motor vehicle speeds and shorten pedestrian crossing distances.

The term was coined by Streetsblog founder Aaron Naparstek in 2014, popularized by Streetfilms director Clarence Eckerson, Jr. and spread widely via social media. Other Twitter hashtags that have been used to describe snow-based traffic-calming measures include #plowza, #slushdown, #snovered and #snowspace.

In Philadelphia, Pennsylvania, at Baltimore and 48th Street, a sneckdown-inspired permanent upgrade to the pedestrian environment was made in 2011. In the 1980s, some planners in Australia distributed cake flour in intersections to observe patterns of vehicle movement hours later.

See also
 Tactical urbanism

References

External links
 Undriven Snow The Economist
 Sneckdown: Using Snow to Design Safer Streets BBC
 What the Heck is a Sneckdown? Treehugger
 2014's Endless Snow Has at Least Been Good for Transportation Nerds Atlantic Cities
 "Sneckdowns" Reveal the Street Space Cars Don't Use Greater Greater Washington
 Sneckdowns: How snowstorms can teach us to build smarter roads The Week
 The 'sneckdown': Nature's pedestrian island WPIX11 News NYC

Traffic calming